This is a list of Swedish journalists.

A

 Amun Abdullahi (23 October 1974 – )
 Kjell Albin Abrahamson (23 June 1945 – 22 September 2016)
 Maria Abrahamsson (21 July 1963 – )
 Martin Adler (30 October 1958 – 23 June 2006)
 Sophie Adlersparre (6 July 1823 – 27 June 1895)
 Ingela Agardh (27 October 1948 – 17 June 2008)
 Catharina Ahlgren (1734 – c. 1800)
 Kattis Ahlström (9 June 1966 – )
 Lisbeth Åkerman (6 May 1967 – )
 Tom Alandh (13 June 1944 – )
 Jarl Alfredius (3 January 1943 – 31 March 2009)
 Karin Alfredsson (1953 – )
 Casten Almqvist (17 March 1962 – )
 Barbro Alving (12 January 1909 – 22 January 1987)
 Eva Andén (1886–1970)
 Leif Anderson (11 February 1925 – 17 November 1999)
 Pamela Andersson (13 March 1965 – )
 Britt Arenander (1941 – )
 Anna Olsdotter Arnmar (22 June 1963 – )
 Elisabeth Åsbrink (29 April 1965 – )
 Tage Aurell (1895–1976)
 Suzanne Axell (27 December 1955 – )
 Torbjörn Axelman (28 April 1932 – )

Back to top

B

 Fredrik Backman (2 June 1981 – )
 Bengt Bedrup (10 June1928 – 27 March 2005)
 Johar Bendjelloul (1 September 1975 – )
 Jan-Olof Bengtsson (30 April 1952 – )
 Lasse Bengtsson (22 December 1951 – )
 Carina Bergfeldt (19 February 1980 – )
 Sven Bergman (12 November 1967 – )
 Erik Bergvall (7 April 1880 – 4 February 1950)
 Tobias Bjarneby (1974 – )
 Olle Björklund (28 June 1916 – 27 March 1981)
 Lisa Bjurwald (24 December 1978 – )
 August Blanche (17 September 1811 – 30 November 1868)
 Anders Blixt (1959 – )
 Maria-Pia Boëthius (1947 – )
 Frida Boisen (25 September 1974 – )
 Jeanette Bonnier (23 January 1934 – 16 April 2016)
 Maria Borelius (6 July 1960 – )
 Agneta Bolme Börjefors (26 April 1941 – 11 August 2008)
 Donald Boström (30 May 1954 – )
 Lasse Brandeby (27 April 1945 – 20 November 2011)
 Elin Brandell (1882–1963)
 Peter Bratt (29 April 1944 – )
 Jane Brick (12 June 1942 – 3 September 2016)

Back to top

C

 Mustafa Can (15 October 1969 – )
 Lydia Capolicchio (7 January 1964 – )
 Ingrid Carlqvist (9 November 1960 – )
 Ebbe Carlsson (28 September 1947 – 3 August 1992)
 Reidar Carlsson (1957 – )
 Maria Cederschiöld (29 June 1856 – 19 October 1935)
 Cecilia Stegö Chilò (25 March 1959 – )
 John Chrispinsson (13 December 1956 – 3 April 2017)
 Sigrid Combüchen (16 January 1942 – )

Back to top

D

 Stina Lundberg Dabrowski (3 December 1950 – )
 Axel Danielsson (15 December 1863 – 30 December 1899)
 Malcolm Dixelius (23 April 1948 – )
 Yukiko Duke (19 January 1966 – )

Back to top

E

 Maryam Ebrahimi (28 May 1976 – )
 Cordelia Edvardson (1 January 1929 – 29 October 2012)
 Anders Ehnmark (2 June 1931 – 29 March 2019)
 Johan Ehrenberg (14 July 1957 – )
 Lennart Ekdal (19 November 1953 – )
 Kajsa Ekis Ekman (1980 – )
 Ulf Elfving (27 November 1942 – )
 Katia Elliott (23 April 1970 – )
 Sigrid Elmblad (28 May 1860 – 23 May 1926)
 Lars Engqvist (13 August 1945 – )
 Albert Engström (1869–1940)
 Louise Epstein (16 July 1965 – )
 Tony Ernst (31 October 1966 – )
 Göran Everdahl (11 November 1964 – )

Back to top

F

 Hanna Fahl (23 October 1978 – )
 Bengt Fahlström (28 August 1938 – 23 February 2017)
 Sofi Fahrman (20 July 1979 – )
 Magnus Falkehed (30 September 1967 – )
 Bengt Feldreich (12 September 1925 – 21 October 2019)
 Helen Svensson Fletre (16 March 1909 – 15 March 1987)
 Louise Flodin (17 September 1828 – 20 March 1923)
 Emilia Fogelklou (20 July 1878 – 26 September 1972)
 Abraham Fornander (4 November 1812 – 1 November 1887)
 Cissi Elwin Frenkel (1 June 1965 – )
 Gustav Fridolin (10 May 1983 – )
 Ellen Fries (23 September 1855 – 31 March 1900)
 Gert Fylking (7 October 1945 – )

Back to top

G

 Magda Gad (17 October 1975 – )
 Jan-Erik Garland (1905–1988)
 Tora Garm-Fex (1890–1973)
 Fredrik Gertten (3 April 1956 – )
 Kristian Gidlund (21 September 1983 – 17 September 2013)
 Jeanette Granberg (19 October 1825 – 2 April 1857)
 Louise Granberg (29 October 1812 – 28 December 1907)
 Göran Greider (1959 – )
 Bengt Grive (21 March 1921 – 17 September 2003)
 Humberto López y Guerra (12 August 1942 – )
 Jan Guillou (17 January 1944 – )
 Doris Gunnarsson (1945 – )

Back to top

H

 Isobel Hadley-Kamptz (21 July 1976 – )
 Annika Hagström (11 October 1942 – )
 Jonas Hallberg (7 December 1944 – )
 Eva Hamilton (29 April 1954 – )
 Britta Hasso (1936–2015)
 Wendela Hebbe (9 September 1808 – 27 August 1899)
 Kristina Hedberg (4 March 1970 – )
 Anna Hedenmo (21 March 1961 – )
 Alfred Hedenstierna (1852–1906)
 Barbro Hedvall (8 February 1944 – )
 Hans-Eric Hellberg (11 May1927 – 10 December 2016)
 Hanna Hellquist (24 July 1980 – )
 Gustaf Hellstrom (28 August 1882 – 27 February 1953)
 Leonardo Henrichsen (29 May 1940 – 29 June 1973)
 Anna Herdenstam (1965 – )
 Marie Hermanson (1956 – )
 Annika Hernroth-Rothstein (29 May 1981 – )
 Johanne Hildebrandt (15 April 1964 – )
 Carin Hjulström (31 August 1963 – )
 Elisabet Höglund (29 August 1944 – )
 Zeth Höglund (29 April 1884 – 13 August 1956)
 Bo Holmström (18 October 1938 – 12 October 2017)
 Karin Hübinette (18 April 1966 – )
 Catarina Hurtig (2 March 1975 – )
 Lennart Hyland (24 September 1919 – 15 March 1993)

Back to top

I

 Dawit Isaak (28 October 1964 – )
 Anders Isaksson (9 May1943 – 17 January 2009)

Back to top

J

 Inger Jalakas (15 December 1951 – )
 Sven Jerring (8 December 1895 – 27 April 1979)
 Klara Johanson (6 October 1875 – 8 October 1948)
 Jonas Jonasson (6 July1961 – )
 Runer Jonsson (29 June 1916 – 29 October 2006)
 Håkan Jörgensen (1969 – )
 Janne Josefsson (27 June 1952 – )
 Håkan Juholt (16 September 1962 – )
 Christina Jutterström (27 March 1940 – )

Back to top

K

 Sigrid Kahle (18 September 1928 – 31 December 2013)
 Kristina Kappelin (13 April 1958 – )
 Salam Karam (9 March 1975 – )
 Nuri Kino (25 February 1965 – )
 Else Kleen (1882–1968)
 Helle Klein (9 July1966 – )
 Anja Kontor (18 December 1964 – )
 Anders Kraft (18 October 1968 – )
 Annette Kullenberg (9 January 1939 – 28 January 2021)
 Björn Kumm (1938 – )
 Andres Küng (13 September 1945 – 10 December 2002)

Back to top

L

 David Lagercrantz (4 September 1962 – )
 Karin Lannby (13 April 1916 – 19 November 2007)
 Milène Larsson ( – )
 Fredrik Laurin (4 March 1964 – )
 Marie Lehmann (14 March 1965 – )
 Michael Leijnegard (11 August 1964 – )
 Mark Levengood (10 July 1964 – )
 Sven Lindahl (25 June 1937 – )
 Christina Lindberg (6 December 1950 – )
 Bengt Linder (26 July 1929 – 17 April 1985)
 Anna Lindmarker (5 January 1961 – )
 Bosse Lindquist (1954 – )
 Herman Lindqvist (1 April 1943 – )
 Ulla Lindström (15 September 1909 – 10 July 1999)
 Bertil Lintner (1953 – )
 Anna-Lena Lodenius (30 June 1958 – )
 Ivar Lo-Johansson (23 February 1901 – 11 April 1990)
 Ebba Lövenskiold (7 October 1977 – )

Back to top

M

 Tomas Mattias Löw (17 September 1970 – )
 Fredrik Malm (2 May 1977 – )
 Ture Malmgren (7 June1851 – 3 August 1922)
 Anna Mannheimer (5 July 1963 – )
 Clara Mannheimer (13 September 1968 – )
 Katrine Marçal (24 October 1983 – )
 Mona Masri (16 January 1985 – )
 Sven Melander (30 October 1947 – )
 Lena Mellin (27 November 1954 – )
 Margareta Momma (1702–1772)
 Tara Moshizi (23 August 1983 – )

Back to top

N

 Ture Nerman (18 May 1886 – 7 October 1969)
 Carolina Neurath (17 November 1985 – )
 Harald Norbelie (5 October 1944 – 6 September 2015)
 Jenny Nordberg ( – )
 Thomas Nordegren (20 February 1953 – )
 Roger Nordin (24 April 1977 – )
 Ester Blenda Nordström (31 March 1891 – 15 October 1948)
 Emil Norlander (1865–1935)
 Birger Norman (30 July 1914 – 13 September 1995)

Back to top

O

 Ingemar Odlander (29 February 1936 – 19 July 2014)
 Per T. Ohlsson (3 March 1958 – 27 October 2021)
 Daniel Öhman (20 May 1973 – )
 Siewert Öholm (7 August 1939 – 25 January 2017)
 Rosalie Olivecrona (9 December 1823  – 4 June 1898)
 Jan Olof Olsson (31 March 1920 – 30 April 1974)
 Leif "Loket" Olsson (12 July 1942 – )

Back to top

P

 August Palm (5 February 1849 – 14 March 1922)
 Christian Palme (15 July 1952 – )
 Christina Patterson (1963 – )
 Anders Paulrud (14 May 1951 – 6 January 2008)
 Håkan Persson ( – )
 Mats Persson (1978 – )
 Agneta Pleijel (1940 – )
 Anders Pontén (16 September 1934 – 12 January 2009)
 Constans Pontin (19 April 1819 – 30 September 1852)
 Daniel Poohl (11 August1981 – )
 Set Poppius (11 October1885 – 10 December 1972)
 Madeleine Pousette (1943 – )

Back to top

Q

Back to top

R

 Lucette Rådström (3 December 1974 – )
 Pär Rådström (1925–1963)
 Karolina Ramqvist (8 November 1976 – )
 Hannes Råstam (1956 – 12 January 2012)
 Fredrik Renander (9 November 1980 – )
 Marimba Roney (24 May 1976 – )
 Göran Rosenberg (11 October 1948 – )
 Andreas Rosenlund (13 April 1967 – )
 Evin Rubar (14 December 1975 – )
 Folke Rydén (17 September 1958 – )
 Sven Rydenfelt (23 January 1911 – 15 February 2005)

Back to top

S

 Hilda Sachs (13 March 1857 – 26 February 1935)
 Åsa Sandell (24 January 1967 – )
 Jan Sandquist (6 August 1932 – )
 Nima Sarvestani (22 December 1958 – )
 Jan Scherman (21 June 1950 – )
 Martin Schibbye (17 October 1980 – )
 Wilhelmine Schröder (23 September 1839 – 13 May 1924)
 Alex Schulman (17 February 1976 – )
 Pontus Schultz (22 August 1972 – 25 August 2012)
 Steve Sem-Sandberg (16 August 1958 – )
 Israel Shamir (1947 – )
 Jonas Sima (31 May 1937 – )
 Per Sinding-Larsen (6 September 1965 – )
 Malou von Sivers (15 January 1953 – )
 Rickard Sjöberg (12 August �1969 – )
 Thomas Sjöberg (1958 – )
 Arne Skoog (1913 – 7 June 1999)
 Staffan Skott (16 August 1943 – 24 September 2021)
 Linda Skugge (9 October 1973 – )
 Lena Smedsaas (20 March 1951 – 6 January 2014)
 Jan Söderqvist (1961 – )
 Sören Sommelius (1941 – )
 Frida Stéenhoff (11 December 1865 – 22 June 1945)
 Dilsa Demirbag Sten (10 October 1969 – )
 Hanna Stjärne (17 March 1969 – )
 Svante Stockselius (31 December 1955 – )
 Sven Stolpe (24 August 1905 – 26 August 1996)
 Fredrik Strage (22 December 1972 – )
 Ingela Strandberg (26 February 1944 – )
 Mats Strandberg (1976 – )
 Fredrik Strömberg (14 July 1968 – )
 Jenny Strömstedt (2 August 1972 – )
 Oscar Patric Sturzen-Becker (1811–1869)
 Margareta Suber (2 November 1892 – 6 April 1984)
 Maria Sveland (1974 – )
 Niklas Svensson (15 January 1973 – )
 Ebba von Sydow (18 February 1981 – )
 Stefan Szende (10 April 1901 – 5 May 1985)

Back to top

T

 Gellert Tamas (1963 – )
 Annika Thor (2 July 1950 – )
 Steffo Törnquist (12 January 1956 – )

Back to top

U

 Cecilia Uddén (28 October 1960 – )

Back to top

V

 Fredrik Virtanen (15 November 1971 – )

Back to top

W

 Ria Wägner (1914–1999)
 David Emanuel Wahlberg (9 September 1882 – 7 March 1949)
 Stefan Wahlberg (1966 – )
 Per Wahlöö (5 August 1926 – 22 June 1975)
 Johannes Wahlström (1981 – )
 Axel Wallengren (26 January 1865 – 4 December 1896)
 Olle Wästberg (6 May 1945 – )
 Lisa Wede (27 September 1951 – )
 Per Wendel (28 January 1947 – 10 October 2005)
 Hildegard Werner (1 March 1834 – 29 August 1911)
 Ingrid Segerstedt Wiberg (18 June 1911 – 21 May 2010)
 Siv Widerberg (12 June 1931 – 24 December 2020)
 Tomas Andersson Wij (6 February 1972 – )
 Erik Wijk (1963 – )
 Hans Wiklund (17 September 1964 – )
 Peter Wolodarski (15 April 1978 – )
 Ola Wong (6 January 1977 – )
 George Wood (10 August 1949 – )

Back to top

X

Back to top

Y

Back to top

Z

 Maciej Zaremba (12 March 1951 – )
 Alexandra Zazzi (7 June 1966 – )
 Helena von Zweigbergk (18 February 1959 – )

Back to top

 
Journalists